Josip Mohorović (born 22 March 1948) is a Croatian retired football player and manager.

Playing career
As a player, he spent much of his career (ten seasons) playing for HNK Rijeka, in process collecting over 400 caps and scoring 34 goals. He was one of the club's most important midfielders during the mid-1970s. He was also the club's top scorer during the 1971–72 and 1974-75 seasons. From Rijeka he moved to the Netherlands, where he played with NAC Breda. He finished his career in Switzerland with Mendrisio, before becoming a manager.

References

External links
 Dutch football stats - Voetbalstats

1948 births
Living people
People from Labin
Association football midfielders
Yugoslav footballers
HNK Rijeka players
NAC Breda players
FC Chiasso players
FC Mendrisio players
Yugoslav First League players
Eredivisie players
Yugoslav expatriate footballers
Expatriate footballers in the Netherlands
Yugoslav expatriate sportspeople in the Netherlands
Expatriate footballers in Switzerland
Yugoslav expatriate sportspeople in Switzerland
Yugoslav football managers
AC Bellinzona managers
Yugoslav expatriate football managers
Expatriate football managers in Switzerland